The Special EU Programmes Body (SEUPB) (Ulster-Scots: Tha By-Ordnar CE Dargs Convenerie) is a cross-border body in the United Kingdom and Republic of Ireland which co-ordinates projects funded by the European Union and implemented in Northern Ireland and adjacent regions: the Border region of the Republic of Ireland, and Western Scotland. The SEUPB is one of six cross-border bodies established after the 1998 Belfast Agreement, given statutory force by Section V of both the North/South Co-operation (Implementation Bodies) (Northern Ireland) Order 1999 and the British-Irish Agreement Act, 1999 in the UK and Republic respectively. 
SEUPB receives and disburses funds under two EU programs: Interreg IVA (€256 m) and Peace III (€333 m). It may also compete for Interreg IVB and IVC funds. It reports to the European Commission, the Northern Ireland Executive and the Government of Ireland.

Peace III
The EU Programme for Peace & Reconciliation in Northern Ireland and the Border Region of Ireland, known as Peace III, aims to "reinforce progress towards a peaceful and stable society and promote reconciliation".

The previous programmes were Peace I (1995–1999) and Peace II (2000–2004).

PEACE PLUS 
In July 2022, a new €1.1 billion / £1 billion "PEACE PLUS" programme was announced, to be administered by SEUPB, jointly funded by the UK and the EU, and with the Northern Ireland Executive and Irish Government providing matching funding.

Impact of Brexit 
As part of the Brexit withdrawal agreement, the United Kingdom, Republic of Ireland and European Union have committed to continue the funding of the Special EU Programmes Body until at least 2023.

References

External links
 seupb.eu Official website

British–Irish Agreement implementation bodies
Organisations based in Belfast
United Kingdom and the European Union
Ireland and the European Union